The following is a list of coaches to have coached the University Football Club, an Australian rules football club who played in the VFL (1908–14).

Key: 
 P = Played
 W = Won
 L = Lost
 D = Drew
 W% = Win percentage

References

External links
University Coaches Win-Loss Records

University Football Club coaches

University Football Club coaches